FORWARD is a creative agency founded by former Recall Group and The Hours Entertainment (HAVAS) founders Alexandre Sap, Leslie Dubest and Fabien Moreau.

Specialty
FORWARD is specialized in cultural marketing, brand content, digital and social network activation, public relations and events

Offices
FORWARD has offices in New York City, Tokyo and Paris. 

FORWARD's clients include Pernod-Ricard Group, Harry Winston, Hermes, The Absolut Company, Estee Lauder, Cartier, Pernod Absinthe, and ABSOLUT's Encore Sessions at le Baron.

References

External links
FORWARD (Archived)
Instagram Followers

Marketing companies
Companies established in 2011